Lamington is a village, which sits in the southern edges of the Morangie forest in Eastern Ross-shire, Scottish Highlands and is in the Scottish council area of Highland.

The village of Tain is located 4 miles to the northeast.

References

Populated places in Ross and Cromarty